Hubert Graignic (born 24 September 1957) is a French former professional racing cyclist. He rode in the 1982 Tour de France.

References

External links
 

1957 births
Living people
People from Guémené-sur-Scorff
French male cyclists
Sportspeople from Morbihan
Cyclists from Brittany